In Fast Company is a 1946 film starring the comedy team of The Bowery Boys.  It is the second film in the series.

Plot
The boys are involved in an altercation with a vegetable vendor and are saved by Father Donovan who convinces the policeman to let them go.  He uses that to guilt Slip into becoming a driver at Cassidy's Cab Company after the owner is knocked out of commission by a rival cab company, Red Circle Cab.

Slip clashes with drivers of the rival company and enlists the aid of the rest of the gang to expose the company to the owner, Mr. McCormick.

Cast

The Bowery Boys
 Leo Gorcey as Terrance 'Slip' Mahoney
 Huntz Hall as Sach
 Bobby Jordan as Bobby
 William Benedict as Whitey
 David Gorcey as Chuck

Remaining cast
 Bernard Gorcey as Louie
 Judy Clark as Mabel Dumbrowski
 Jane Randolph as Marian McCormick
 Douglas Fowley as Steve Trent
 Charles D. Brown as Father Donovan

Production
Gorcey's father, Bernard Gorcey makes his first appearances as the owner of Louie's Sweet Shop, and it is also the first appearance of an all-out fistfight which would become a common plot element in the series.

David Gorcey's first Bowery Boys film. He would remain with the series up until the end in 1958, playing the role of 'Chuck'.

The film, made under the working title In High Gear, is a remake, with Monogram Pictures filming an earlier version in 1938.

Home media
Warner Archives released the film on made-to-order DVD in the United States as part of "The Bowery Boys, Volume One" on November 23, 2012.

References

External links 
 
 
 
 

1946 films
Bowery Boys films
Monogram Pictures films
American comedy films
1946 comedy films
American black-and-white films
Films directed by Del Lord
1940s English-language films
1940s American films